Neoscona crucifera is an orb-weaver spider in the family Araneidae. It is found in the United States from Maine to Florida in the east, to Minnesota in the Midwest, to Arizona in the southwest, southern California coastal communities and in Mexico. Its common names include Hentz orbweaver (after Nicholas Marcellus Hentz), spotted orbweaver, and barn spider. The name "barn spider" is also commonly used for a different spider, Araneus cavaticus.

Generally nocturnal, females may become diurnal in the fall. The upper surface of the abdomen is brown and hairy. The legs display alternating light and dark brown bands. The undersurface of the abdomen is black, with two white spots.

This species is relatively variable in color and sometimes pattern, but is most commonly seen sporting a rusty-red or golden orange color. The orb-shaped web is very large and is often constructed on buildings and other man-made structures, often several feet above ground, especially near outdoor lights. This species is most conspicuous in late summer and early fall.

The eggsac consists of fluffy yellow threads in a rolled leaf over a lenticular or spherical egg mass  in diameter, which may contain up to 1,000 eggs. Juveniles are frequently preyed upon by mud daubers. This species will bite if provoked, but its venom is not dangerous to humans.

Synonyms
Neoscona crucifera has also been known by a number of taxonomic synonyms.
Aranea crucifera albimaculata Strand, 1908
Epeira crucifera Keyserling, 1864
Epeira domiciliorum Emerton, 1884
Epeira hentzii Keyserling 1864
Epeira lentiginosa Blackwall 1862
Neoscona arkansa Chamberlin & Ivie, 1942
Neoscona benjamina Comstock 1940
Neoscona hentzi Kaston 1977
Neoscona nebraskensis Chamberlin & Ivie, 1942
Neoscona sacra Chamberlin & Ivie, 1944

References

crucifera
Spiders of the United States
Spiders of Mexico
Spiders described in 1839